Senator Sweet may refer to:

Benjamin Sweet (1832–1874), Wisconsin State Senate
William L. Sweet (1850–1931), New York State Senate